"The Tuxedo Begins" is the eighth episode of the sixth season of the American television comedy series 30 Rock, and the 111th overall episode of the series. It was directed by John Riggi, and written by Josh Siegal and Dylan Morgan. The episode originally aired on NBC in the United States on February 16, 2012. Guest stars in this episode include Will Forte and Steve Buscemi.

In this episode, Jack Donaghy (Alec Baldwin) considers running for mayor of New York City after he is mugged on his way to work; Liz Lemon (Tina Fey) becomes frustrated by increasing disorderly behaviour on the subway, so she decides to get in on it by imitating a mentally ill elderly woman to scare people away; and Jenna Maroney (Jane Krakowski) and boyfriend Paul (Will Forte) consider living normally as a couple as a potential new fetish, but become concerned that they are in fact simply settling down.

Plot
On her way to work, Liz Lemon (Tina Fey) is delayed by what she perceives to be the failure of other subway goers to observe basic social norms. In generalizing their behavior, Liz sees it as a sign of the breakdown of New York society. While she is complaining to Jack Donaghy (Alec Baldwin) about this in a call, his cell phone is stolen at knifepoint in a construction tunnel. Jack responds to his mugging by hiding in his office for days and organizing the wealthy to protect themselves from the apparently angry lower classes.

Shortly thereafter, Liz comes down with a cold and dons an elderly woman costume from one of The Girlie Show with Tracy Jordan sketches. To her amazement, she discovers that the getup causes people to avoid her on the subway, as they fear that she is sick and potentially mentally ill. Liz concludes that society rewards rulebreaking and anti-social behavior, so she escalates her imitation of an insane old woman to get more personal space in her day-to-day errands. Meanwhile, Jenna Maroney (Jane Krakowski) and her boyfriend Paul (Will Forte) consider that behaving like a normal couple may be a new fetish. This is inspired by Paul falling asleep instead of taking part in an evening of sexual adventure. The two embrace their new way of living with gusto.

Fearing that he needs to exercise control over the lower classes, Jack considers a run for mayor. Eventually, he ventures out with the help of Tracy Jordan (Tracy Morgan) to confront his fear of walking by the site of his mugging. Suddenly, Liz, in full costume, approaches him to borrow money and a startled Jack throws her in a pile of garbage bags. When the crowd reacts positively to his apparent conquest of the old woman that had been terrorizing the subway, both Jack and Liz come to realize that New Yorkers do cheer those that uphold order after all. Finally, Jenna and Paul reach the realization that their normal behaviour is not a fetish and rather a sign that they are beginning to settle down. They resolve to take a "sexual walkabout" for three months to make sure they are ready.

Reception

Ratings
According to the Nielsen Media Research, this episode of 30 Rock was watched by 3.59 million households in its original American broadcast.  It earned a 1.5 rating/4 share in the 18–49 demographic.

References

External links
 

30 Rock (season 6) episodes
Batman in other media